The following lists Missouri high schools and the athletic conferences in which they compete.
Under the current system used by the Missouri State High School Activities Association some conference member teams may also compete in the same playoff district while others are in districts with non-conference members. As a general rule most conferences contain schools within their region and of similar class size, the class based on school enrollment.

Archdiocesan Athletic Association (AAA)

Big 8

Big Springs

Black River League

Bootheel

Carroll-Livingston Activities Association (CLAA)

Central Activities

Central Missouri Activities (CMAC)

Central Ozark

Clarence Cannon

Cooper County Activities Association (CCAA)

Crossroads
The Kansas members of the conference withdrew to form a new league within the Kansas State High School Activities Association.

Eastern Missouri

Four Rivers

Frisco

Gasconade Valley

Gateway Athletic Conference

Golden Valley Vernon

Grand River

Great Plains

Greater Kansas City Suburban Conference (GKCSC)
Grain Valley and Smithville joined the conference for the 2018–19 school year.

Harrison-Daviess-Caldwell (HDC)

Highway 275

Interscholastic League (Kansas City)

Interstate-70 (I-70)

Jefferson County Athletic Association

Kansas City Interscholastic (KCI)

Kaysinger

Lewis & Clark

Mark Twain

Metro Catholic Conference (MCC), St. Louis

Metro (Kansas City) Christian Athletic Association
Two former members, Heritage Christian Academy (Olathe, KS) and Cair Paravel Latin (Topeka, KS) are now full members of the Kansas State High School Activities Association.

Metro League

Metro (St. Louis) ?? League
This League appears to be defunct.

Metro Women's Athletics Association (MWAA)

Mid-Lakes

Midland Empire

Mid-State

Mineral Area Activities Association (MAAA)

Mississippi Valley

Missouri River Valley

East Division
Carrollton and Richmond have been conference members since its founding in 1928. Lexington joined in 1934 and Lafayette County (Higginsville) in 1937.

West Division
Grain Valley left the conference at the end of the 2014-15 school year and joined the Suburban Kansas City Conference. Warrensburg replaced Grain Valley.

Center and Clinton were added beginning in the 2020-21 school year. 

Excelsior Springs departed after the 2021-22 school year and followed Grain Valley to the Suburban Conference.

North Central

Ozark 7

Ozark

Ozarks Foothills

Ozark Highlands Conference

Platte Valley

Polk County League

Public High League (PHL)

Scott-Mississippi

Show-Me

South Central Association

South Central – AA

Southeast Missouri (SEMO)

Southwest Central League (SWCL)

Southwest Conference

Stoddard County Activities Association (SCAA)

Suburban St Louis

Summit

Tri-County–Central

Tri-County–North

Tri-County–Southeast

Western Missouri
Adrian 
Appleton City 
Archie
Drexel
Jasper 
Lakeland
Liberal
Midway
Osceola
Rich Hill

White River

Independents
The following lists schools that are independents, meaning they do not belong to or compete in any of the athletic conferences above. However they do compete against other schools in Missouri (and sometimes surrounding states) on a non-conference basis. Independents are included in the MSHSAA playoff system based on a District assignment separate from any athletic conference.

See also
 List of Missouri state high school football champions
 List of Missouri state high school baseball champions
 List of Missouri state high school boys basketball championships
 List of Missouri state high school girls basketball championships
 List of Missouri state high school girls volleyball championships

References

 To verify each school's conference at the MSHSAA link, click on the school name. The conference information is included in each school's profile.

High schools by athletic conferences
High schools